Walter David Neumann (born 1 January 1946) is a British mathematician who works in topology, geometric group theory, and singularity theory. He is an emeritus professor at Barnard College, Columbia University. Neumann obtained his Ph.D. under the joint supervision of Friedrich Hirzebruch and Klaus Jänich at the University of Bonn in 1969.

He is a son of the mathematicians Bernhard Neumann and Hanna Neumann. His brother Peter M. Neumann was also a mathematician.

He is in the Inaugural Class of Fellows of the American Mathematical Society.

References

External links
Google Scholar Profile
Home page at Columbia

20th-century British mathematicians
Topologists
1946 births
Fellows of the American Mathematical Society
Living people